Charles Ancliffe (1880 – 20 December 1952) was an Irish born composer of light music, chiefly remembered for his marches and waltzes.

Life and works
Charles Ancliffe was born in Kildare, Ireland, the son of an army bandmaster. 
After studying at the Royal Military School of Music, Kneller Hall, he followed in his father's footsteps by becoming a bandmaster himself.  From 1900 to 1918 he was Bandmaster of the First Battalion, South Wales Borderers, seeing much service in India. During this period he wrote many popular pieces of music including marches such as The Liberators, and Castles in Spain. 
He also composed dozens of short genre pieces, often styled 'intermezzo' or 'entr'acte',  several songs and ingeniously titled suites such as  Below Bridges.  which had the titles Wapping Old Stairs, Poplar and Stepney Church, — all London bridges.

Around the time of the First World War Ancliffe composed many waltzes, and it is mainly for these that he is remembered.  These included Hesitation, Alpine Echoes, and Smiles Then Kisses, the titles reflecting the age in which they were written. Several of these enjoyed renewed popularity with the fashion for ‘olde-tyme dancing’ after World War II.

Nights of Gladness
It was for Nights of Gladness, written in 1912, that Ancliffe became most famous. The waltz became so popular all over the world that in later years the BBC named a long-running series of light music programmes after it, using it as the signature tune

More than a hundred years after it was written it is still to be found included on many CD compilations of light music, played by notable orchestras such as the Royal Philharmonic Orchestra.

After leaving the services Charles Ancliffe  was a regular conductor of the Scarborough Military Band, and was also a frequent guest conductor of his own works on BBC Radio.

Selected compositions

Waltzes
 April Clouds
 Dream Princess
 Festive Days
 Irish Whispers
 Shy Glancess
 Southern Nights
 Temptation
 Thrills
 Twilight Time
 Unforgotten Hours
 Smiles, then kisses

Miscellaneous short pieces

 A Forest Wooing
 April's Lady 
 Burma Intermezzo
 Cinderella's Wedding
 Down in Zanzibar
 El Saludo
 Fragrance 
 Hans the Stroller
 Mariette-Coquette
 Moon Maid
 Peacock's Parade
 Penelope's Garden
 Secrets, Valley of Roses
 The Flutter of the Fay

Suites
 Below Bridges
  Southern Impressions
 The Purple Vine (in three movements) : The Vintagers, The Purple Vine and Evening at the Inn
 Suite Poetique

Songs
 Ask Daddy 
 Someday in Somebody's Eyes
 I Cannot Live Without You.

References

External links
 
 

1880 births
1952 deaths
Light music composers